Matt Brink (born 10 June 1975) is a South African cricketer. He played in fifteen first-class and nineteen List A matches for Boland from 1994 to 2007.

See also
 List of Boland representative cricketers

References

External links
 

1975 births
Living people
South African cricketers
Boland cricketers
Mpumalanga cricketers
People from Barberton, Mpumalanga